The long jump at the World Championships in Athletics has been contested by both men and women since the inaugural edition in 1983.

Medalists

Men

Women

References

Bibliography
 

Events at the World Athletics Championships